Ypsolopha canariella, the canary ypsolopha moth, is a moth of the family Ypsolophidae. The species was first described by Lord Walsingham in 1881. It is found throughout North America from sea level up to elevations of 1,830 meters. In Canada it occurs in most provinces, from British Columbia and Alberta to Ontario. It is present in most of the continental United States. It is known from a wide variety of habitats, including mixed wood forests, semi-arid scrubland, prairies and badlands.

The wingspan is about 20 mm. The forewings are yellow with a reddish-brown triangular area in the middle of the wing. The hindwings are white or pale gray and semitransparent with a long fringe. Adults are on wing from June to September.

The larvae feed on the leaves of Salix and Lonicera species, as well as the flowers of Symphoricarpos albus. They are probably solitary defoliators. Pupation takes place in a tubular shaped silken cocoon on a leaf.

References

Ypsolophidae
Moths described in 1881
Moths of North America